Arsen Sheklian, better known by his stage name Arsen Roulette, (born July 23, 1976) is an American singer, lyricist, guitar player and upright bass player from Fresno, California. Roulette is a prolific songwriter penning more than 100 songs in the Rockabilly Genre, a mixture of Rock and Roll, Blues and American Hillbilly music. In 1996 Arsen discovered Rocabilly music and in 1997 Arsen formed the rockabilly trio "Arsen Roulette and the Ricochets", the bands rotating members were a veritable whose who of neo-rockabilly giants. After several name changes and a successful U.S. tour, the trio grew into a quartet of semi-permanent musicians, mainly European Rock-A-Billy musicians who play full-time in other bands of this genre. Arsen Roulette makes bi-annual pilgrimages to Europe, frequently headlining Europe's biggest Rockabilly events; Summer Jamboree, Hemsby, Screamin' Festival and the Brighton Rumble just to name a few.

Currently, Arsen is playing lead guitar in a local Rockabilly band that is well established in Central California, Jailbreak, with lead singer, Greg "The Jailhouse Daddy" Kosobud and continues to tour all over the world as Arsen Roulette.

Discography

Studio albums
The Lost Recordings (CD, 2005)
Let's Get on With It (CD, 2006)
Knock Me A Kiss (CD, vinyl,2007)
LIVE in MONO-PHONIC (CD, vinyl,2008)
Dear You (CD 2011)
Hit, Git Split (vinyl 2014)

Compilations
Viva Las Vegas 7 (CD, 2004)
Viva Las Vegas 9 (CD, 2006)
Lost & Found: Rockabilly And Jump Blues (CD, 2007)

B-Sides
"Honey Hush" (CD, 2007)
"Mamma Voglio L'uvo a la Coque" (CD, 2011)
"La Piu' Bella Del Mondo" (CD, 2011)

Filmography 
Strolling Back to You (Music video – Let's Get On With It)
Down the Line (Music video – Beauty 24)
Beauty 24 – Full-length documentary

References

External links 
 
 El Toro Records
 Georgio's and son
 Facebook Arsen Roulette

1976 births
Living people
American rock musicians